Tere Pyar Mein  is a 1979 Indian Hindi-language film directed by Subhash Sharma, starring Mithun Chakraborty, Sarika, Vijayendra Ghatge, Paintal, Nadira, Madan Puri and Iftekhar.

Cast

Mithun Chakraborty as Shekhar
Sarika as Seema
Vijayendra Ghatge as Akash
Shyamlee as Anju
Nadira
Madan Puri
Iftekhar

Soundtrack

References

External links 
 
 https://web.archive.org/web/20110317190011/http://www.bollywoodhungama.com/movies/cast/4096/index.html
 https://archive.today/20130126055658/http://ibosnetwork.com/asp/filmbodetails.asp?id=Tere+Pyar+Mein

1979 films
1970s Hindi-language films
Indian romantic musical films
Films scored by Bappi Lahiri
1970s romantic musical films